Parapterulicium is a genus of fungi in the order Russulales. The genus contains two species found in Brazil and Argentina.

Taxonomy 
Parapterulicium octopodites was reclassified as Baltazaria octopodites in 2018.

Species

References

External links

Russulales genera